Reverend Norman Rawson was a World War I veteran, attaining the rank of captain, and minister at Centenary Church in Hamilton, Ontario from 1937 until 1954. In 1938, he was a candidate in the 1938 Conservative Party of Ontario leadership convention receiving 22 votes and coming in last of four candidates behind the winner, George Drew. He subsequently became a speaker for the Leadership League, a conservative movement established by The Globe and Mail publisher George McCullagh, which proposed one party rule in Canada under direction of business leaders.

References

Ministers of the United Church of Canada